General elections were held in British Honduras on 20 March 1957. The ruling People's United Party won all nine seats contested. This was the first of two occasions they would sweep the House. It was the PUP's first election under the leadership of George Cadle Price. Price would lead the party until 1996.

The Honduran Independence Party (HIP), a forerunner of the modern United Democratic Party, was founded the previous year by an anti-Price faction within the PUP led by former PUP leader Leigh Richardson. The party fielded five out of a possible nine candidates, but failed to win any seats.

The elections were the last for the pro-colonial National Party. Charles Westby, the NP's only successful candidate in the 1954 election, ran as an independent. The HIP and NP merged in 1958 to form the National Independence Party.

Results

By division

References

British H
General elections in Belize
1957 in British Honduras
British H
British H